Edward Bennett Derr (May 20, 1891 – August 13, 1974) was an American film producer during the genesis of the sound era. Born in West Bethlehem, Pennsylvania in 1891, he would produce almost forty films in the 1930s and early 1940s.  Derr retired from the film industry in 1943, after co-producing The Deerslayer, for which he also wrote the screenplay adaptation from the James Fenimore Cooper's novel, The Deerslayer: Or, the First War-Path, A Tale.

Filmography
(as per AFI's database)

References

External links
 
 
 

1891 births
1974 deaths
American film producers